Winks Panorama, also known as Winks Lodge, was a hotel near Pinecliffe, Colorado catering to African-American tourists during the early and middle 20th century. The lodge was built in the Lincoln Hills Country Club, which was at the time the only African-American resort in the western United States. The Lincoln Hills club was organized in 1922, selling lots with payments as low as $5.00 down and $5.00 per month. The lodge was built by Obrey Wendell "Winks" Hamlet in 1928. Hamlet had been involved in the original club project, and had been assembling land for a lodge since 1925. The Wall Street Crash of 1929 caused many lots in Lincoln Hills to be abandoned, but Hamlet promoted the lodge nationally through advertisements in Ebony and attracted a clientele from the eastern United States.

The hillside lodge used local stone for the foundation, with a three-story shingled superstructure. The first floor was for service and storage, the second for dining and entertainment, and the third included six guest rooms and a shared bath. Several cabins surrounded the main lodge, including a honeymoon cabin and a tavern.

Prominent guests included Count Basie, Billy Eckstein, Duke Ellington, Lena Horne, Langston Hughes and Zora Neale Hurston.

The lodge operated until Winks' death in 1965. It is now owned by the James Beckwourth Mountain Club, which has undertaken restoration of the lodge as a conference center. Winks Panorama was listed on the National Register of Historic Places on March 28, 1980.

See also
National Register of Historic Places listings in Gilpin County, Colorado

Other African-American resorts included:
American Beach, Florida
Oak Bluffs, Massachusetts
Idlewild, Michigan

References

External links

Gilpin County News article on Wink Hamlet and the restoration of the lodge
Denver Urban Spectrum article on Winks Lodge and Lincoln Hills
Beckwourth Mountain Club, Winks Lodge

Hotel buildings completed in 1928
Hotel buildings on the National Register of Historic Places in Colorado
Buildings and structures in Gilpin County, Colorado
Defunct hotels in the United States
African-American history of Colorado
African-American cultural history
1928 establishments in Colorado
National Register of Historic Places in Gilpin County, Colorado